Jean-Pierre Ducasse, was a professional French cyclist, who finished second in the 1967 Vuelta a España, and died in 1969 due to carbon monoxide poisoning.

Biography 
Ducasse became French national champion cyclo-cross in 1967, and was offered a contract for the Pelforth team. He joined the 1967 Vuelta a España in support of Jan Janssen.

1967 Vuelta a España 
During that Vuelta, Ducasse was in escape groups in the fourth and fifth stage, and became the leader in the general classification.  In the mountains, other cyclists attacked, but with the help from Janssen, Ducasse was able to keep his time losses limited.
It was different in the individual time trials: Ducasse lost 11 minutes in the first time trial, but he could afford this and was still the leader. In the second time trial, the penultimate stage, Ducasse lost time again, and this time his team leader Janssen took over the lead. Ducasse finished the Vuelta in second place, and was the surprise of this Vuelta.

Death 
While training in South France, in early 1969, Ducasse slept in a hotel room together with cyclist Michel Bon. The heating was defect, and both died of carbon monoxide poisoning.

Palmares 

1967
 French national cyclocross champion
 Vuelta a España: 2nd place

1968
 French national cyclocross champion
 Vuelta a España: 12th place
 Tour de France: 31st place

References

External links

French male cyclists
1944 births
1969 deaths
Cyclists from Paris
Deaths from carbon monoxide poisoning
Cyclo-cross cyclists